Denys Serhiyovych Rezepov (born 11 February 2002) is a Ukrainian professional footballer who plays as an attacking midfielder for Ukrainian Premier League club Inhulets Petrove.

References

External links
 
 

2002 births
Living people
Footballers from Kharkiv
Ukrainian footballers
Association football midfielders
FC Metalist 1925 Kharkiv players
FC Vovchansk players
FC Inhulets Petrove players
Ukrainian Premier League players
Ukrainian First League players
Ukrainian Second League players
Ukrainian expatriate footballers
Expatriate footballers in the Czech Republic
Ukrainian expatriate sportspeople in the Czech Republic